The American Music Awards for Favorite Artist – Adult Contemporary has been awarded since 1992. Years reflect the year during which the awards were presented, for works released in the previous year (until 2003 onward, when awards were handed out on November of the same year). The all-time winner in this category is Celine Dion with 4 wins, she is also the most nominated artist with 6 nominations.

Winners and nominees

1990s

2000s

2010s

2020s

Category facts

Multiple wins

 4 wins
 Celine Dion

 3 wins
 Adele
 Taylor Swift

 2 wins
 Michael Bolton
 Kelly Clarkson
 Shawn Mendes

Multiple nominations

 6 nominations
 Celine Dion

 4 nominations
 Michael Bolton
 Maroon 5

 3 nominations
 Adele
 Mariah Carey
 Kelly Clarkson
 Daughtry
 Whitney Houston
 Norah Jones
 Bruno Mars
 P!nk
 Ed Sheeran
 Taylor Swift

 2 nominations
 Michael Bublé
 Cher
 Eagles
 John Mayer
 Shawn Mendes
 Katy Perry
 Train
 Meghan Trainor
 Shania Twain
 Phil Collins (once as a solo artist and once as a member of Genesis)

References

American Music Awards
Awards established in 1992